HD 40873 is a star in the northern constellation of Auriga, a few degrees to the south of Delta Aurigae. Located around 455 light-years distant, it shines with a luminosity approximately 38 times that of the Sun and has an effective temperature of 7,753 K. It is a suspected variable star and has a fairly rapid rotation rate, showing a projected rotational velocity of 134 km/s. Eggen (1985) suggested it is a probable member of the Hyades Supercluster.

Samuel Molyneux named this star Telescopica in Auriga. Flamsteed catalogued it as 35 Camelopardali Heveliana, which is the name James Bradley continued to use, although it is within the borders of the modern constellation Auriga. Francis Baily reclassified it to Auriga as star 1924 in the British Association's 1845 Catalogue of 8377 Stars.

HD 40873 is considered to be an Am star, a chemically peculiar star with unusually strong absorption lines of metals.  It has been given a spectral type of kA5mA7IV, although other catalogues have given more normal classifications such as A7 V or A7 III.

Components
HD 40873 has a 9th magnitude class A5 companion about half an arc-minute away. It is designated as SAO 25549. The companion is itself a pair of stars, each of similar brightness, separated by 0.6".

References

A-type main-sequence stars
A-type giants
Am stars
Suspected variables
Hyades Stream
Auriga (constellation)
Durchmusterung objects
Camelopardalis, 35
040873
028765
2123